The 10th Alabama Infantry Regiment was an infantry regiment that served in the Confederate Army during the American Civil War.

Service 
The 10th Alabama Infantry Regiment was mustered in at Montgomery, Alabama on June 4, 1861. The regiment surrendered at Appomattox Court House. The 10th mustered 1,429 men during its existence. It suffered approximately 300 killed in action or mortally wounded and 180 men who died of disease, for a total of approximately 470 fatalities. An additional 249 men were discharged or transferred from the regiment.

Commanders 
 Colonel John Horace Forney
 Colonel John Jefferson Woodward
 Colonel William Henry Forney
 Colonel William Thomas Smith

See also 

Alabama Civil War Confederate Units
Alabama in the American Civil War

References 

Units and formations of the Confederate States Army from Alabama
1861 establishments in Alabama
Military units and formations established in 1861